Stetsenkovo is a rural locality (a selo) in Novokalitvenskoye Rural Settlement, Rossoshansky District, Voronezh Oblast, Russia. The population was 217 as of 2010. There are 7 streets.

Geography 
Stetsenkovo is located 60 km southeast of Rossosh (the district's administrative centre) by road. Ivanovka is the nearest rural locality.

References 

Rural localities in Rossoshansky District